The Sex Pistols were an English punk rock band formed in London in 1975. Although their initial career lasted just two and a half years, they were one of the most culturally influential acts in popular music. The band initiated the punk movement in the United Kingdom and inspiring many later punk and alternative rock musicians, while their clothing and hairstyles were a significant influence on punk image.

The Sex Pistols first line up consisted of vocalist Johnny Rotten (John Lydon), guitarist Steve Jones, drummer Paul Cook, and bassist Glen Matlock. Matlock was replaced by Sid Vicious in early 1977. Under the management of Malcolm McLaren, they attracted widespread media controversies bringing them to the attention of the mainstream British press. They swore live on-air during a December 1976 television interview, while the lyrics of their May 1977 single "God Save the Queen" described the monarchy a "fascist regime", instantly popularizing punk rock in the UK. "God Save the Queen" was banned by the BBC and nearly every independent radio station in Britain, making it one of the most censored records in British history.

The Sex Pistols' only album, Never Mind the Bollocks, Here's the Sex Pistols (1977) became a UK number one and a staple record of punk rock. In January 1978, at the final gig of a difficult and media-hyped tour of the US, Rotten announced the band's break-up live on stage. Over the next few months, the three remaining members recorded songs for McLaren's film of the Sex Pistols' story, The Great Rock 'n' Roll Swindle. Vicious died of a heroin overdose in February 1979 following his arrest for the alleged murder of his girlfriend, Nancy Spungen. Rotten, Jones, Cook and Matlock reunited for a successful tour in 1996. Further one-off performances and short tours followed over the next decade.

The Sex Pistols have been recognised as a highly influential band. In 2004, Rolling Stone placed them No. 58 on its list of the "100 Greatest Artists of All Time". On 24 February 2006, the Sex Pistols—the four original members plus Vicious—were inducted into the Rock and Roll Hall of Fame, although they refused to attend the ceremony.

History

Formation
The Sex Pistols evolved from The Strand (sometimes known as The Swankers), formed in London in 1972 by teenagers Steve Jones on vocals, Paul Cook on drums and Wally Nightingale on guitar. According to Jones, both he and Cook played on instruments he had stolen. The band regularly hung out at two clothing shops on the King's Road in Chelsea, London: John Krivine and Steph Raynor's Acme Attractionsand Malcolm McLaren and Vivienne Westwood's Too Fast to Live, Too Young to Die. McLaren's and Westwood's shop had opened in 1971 as Let It Rock, with a 1950s revival Teddy Boy theme. It had been renamed in 1972 to focus on another revival trend, the '50s rocker look associated with Marlon Brando. According to John Lydon, "Malcolm and Vivienne were really a pair of shysters: they would sell anything to any trend that they could grab onto." The shop became a focal point of the punk rock scene, bringing together participants such as the future Sid Vicious, Marco Pirroni, Gene October, and Mark Stewart, among many others. Jordan, the wildly styled shop assistant, is credited with "pretty well single-handedly paving the punk look".

In early 1974, Jones asked McLaren to take over management. Glen Matlock, an art student who occasionally worked at 'Too Fast to Live, Too Young to Die', joined as bassist. In November, McLaren temporarily relocated to New York City. Before his departure, he and Westwood had conceived a new identity for their shop: renamed SEX, it changed its focus from retro couture to S&M-inspired "anti-fashion", advertised as "Specialists in rubberwear, glamourwear & stagewear". After informally managing and promoting the New York Dolls for a few months, McLaren returned to London in May 1975. Inspired by the punk scene that was emerging in Lower Manhattan—in particular by the Ramones and the radical visual style and attitude of Richard Hell, then with Television—McLaren began taking a greater interest in The Strand members.

The group had been rehearsing regularly, overseen by McLaren's friend Bernard Rhodes, and had performed publicly for the first time. Soon after McLaren's return, Nightingale was kicked out of the band and Jones, uncomfortable as frontman, took over guitar duties. According to journalist and former McLaren employee Phil Strongman, around this time the band adopted the name QT Jones and the Sex Pistols (or QT Jones & His Sex Pistols, as one Rhodes-designed T-shirt put it). McLaren had been talking with the New York Dolls' Sylvain Sylvain about coming over to England to front the group. When those plans fell through, McLaren, Rhodes and the band began looking locally for a new member to assume the lead vocal duties. As described by Matlock, "Everyone had long hair then, even the milkman, so what we used to do was if someone had short hair we would stop them in the street and ask them if they fancied themselves as a singer". For instance, Midge Ure, the former singer with boy band Slik who was also later to be the front man of Rich Kids (with Matlock) and Ultravox, claims to have been approached by McLaren, but to have refused the offer. With the search going nowhere, McLaren made several calls to Richard Hell, who also turned down the invitation.

Lydon joins
In August 1975, Rhodes spotted nineteen-year-old John Lydon wearing a Pink Floyd T-shirt with the words I Hate handwritten above the band's name and holes scratched through the Floyd members' eyes. Reports vary at this point: the same day, or soon after, either Rhodes or McLaren asked Lydon to come to a nearby pub in the evening to meet Jones and Cook. According to Jones, "He came in with green hair. I thought he had a really interesting face. I liked his look. He had his 'I Hate Pink Floyd' T-shirt on, and it was held together with safety pins. John had something special...he was a real arsehole—but smart." When the pub closed, the group moved on to SEX, where Lydon, who had given little thought to singing, was convinced to improvise along to Alice Cooper's "I'm Eighteen" on the shop jukebox. Though the performance drove the band members to laughter, McLaren convinced them to start rehearsing with Lydon.

Lydon later described the social context in which the band formed:

Early Seventies Britain was a very depressing place. It was completely run-down, there was trash on the streets, total unemployment—just about everybody was on strike...if you came from the wrong side of the tracks...then you had no hope in hell and no career prospects at all. Out of that came...the Sex Pistols and then a whole bunch of copycat wankers after us.

'New Musical Express' (NME) journalist Nick Kent occasionally jammed with the band, but left when Lydon's joined. According to Lydon: "I took one look at him and said, 'No. That has to go... He's never written a good word about me ever since." Cook had a full-time job and was threatening to quit the band. According to Matlock', Cook "created a smokescreen" by claiming Jones was not skilled enough to be their sole guitarist. An advertisement was placed in Melody Maker for a "Whizz Kid Guitarist. Not older than 20. Not worse looking than Johnny Thunders" (referring to the lead guitarist of the New York Dolls, and later the Heartbreakers). Most of those who auditioned were incompetent, but in McLaren's view, the process created a new sense of solidarity among the four band members. Steve New was considered the one talented guitarist to have tried out and the band invited him to join. Jones was improving rapidly, however, and the band's developing sound had no room for the technical lead work at which New was adept. He departed after a month.

Lydon was renamed "Johnny Rotten" by Jones, apparently because of his bad teeth. The band also settled on a name. After considering options such as Le Bomb, Subterraneans, the Damned, Beyond, Teenage Novel, Kid Gladlove, and Crème de la Crème, they decided on Sex Pistols—a shortened form of the name they had apparently been working under informally. McLaren later said the name derived "from the idea of a pistol, a pin-up, a young thing, a better-looking assassin". Not given to modesty, false or otherwise, he added: "[I] launched the idea in the form of a band of kids who could be perceived as being bad." The group began writing original material: Rotten was the lyricist and Matlock the primary melody writer (though their first collaboration, "Pretty Vacant", had a complete lyric by Matlock, which Rotten tweaked a bit); official credit was shared equally among the four.

Their first gig was arranged by Matlock, who was studying at Saint Martins College. The band played at the school on 6 November 1975, in support of a pub rock group called Bazooka Joe, arranging to use their amps and drums. The Sex Pistols performed several cover songs, including the Who's "Substitute", the Small Faces' "Whatcha Gonna Do About It", and "(I'm Not Your) Steppin' Stone", made famous by the Monkees; according to attendees, they were unexceptional musically aside from being extremely loud. Before the Pistols could play the few original songs they had written to date, Bazooka Joe pulled the plugs as they saw their gear being trashed. A brief physical altercation between members of the two bands took place on stage.

Early following 
The Saint Martins gig was followed by performances at colleges around London. The band's core early followers—including Siouxsie Sioux, Steven Severin and Billy Idol, who were inspired to form bands of their own, as well as Jordan and Soo Catwoman—came to be known as the Bromley Contingent, after the suburban borough several were from. Their cutting-edge fashion, much of it supplied by SEX, ignited a trend that was adopted by the new fans the band attracted. McLaren and Westwood saw the incipient London punk movement as a vehicle for more than just couture. They were influenced by the May 1968 radical uprising in Paris, particularly by the ideology and agitations of the Situationists, as well as the anarchist thought of Buenaventura Durruti and others.

These interests were shared with Jamie Reid, an old friend of McLaren who took over the design of the band's visual imagery in the spring of 1976. The cut-up lettering (like that used in the notes left by kidnappers or terrorists) employed to create the classic Sex Pistols logo and many subsequent designs for the band was actually introduced by McLaren's friend Helen Wallington-Lloyd. "We used to talk to John [Lydon] a lot about the Situationists," Reid later said. "The Sex Pistols seemed the perfect vehicle to communicate ideas directly to people who weren't getting the message from left-wing politics." McLaren was also arranging for the band's first photo sessions. According to writer Jon Savage, Lydon "with his green hair, hunched stance and ragged look...looked like a cross between Uriah Heep and Richard Hell.".

The first Sex Pistols gig to attract attention was as a supporting act for Eddie and the Hot Rods, a leading pub rock group, at the Marquee on 12 February 1976. Rotten "was now really pushing the barriers of performance, walking off stage, sitting with the audience, throwing Jordan across the dance floor and chucking chairs around, before smashing some of Eddie and the Hot Rods' gear." The band's first review appeared in the NME, accompanied by a brief interview in which Steve Jones declared, "Actually we're not into music. We're into chaos." Among those who read the article were two students at the Bolton Institute of Technology, Howard Devoto and Pete Shelley, who headed down to London in search of the Sex Pistols. After chatting with McLaren at SEX, they saw the band at a couple of late February gigs. The two friends immediately began organising their own Pistols-style group, Buzzcocks. As Devoto later put it, "My life changed the moment that I saw the Sex Pistols."

The Pistols soon played other important venues, notabally debuting at Oxford Street's 100 Club on 30 March. On 3 April, they played for the first time at the Nashville, supporting the 101ers. The pub rock group's lead singer, Joe Strummer, saw the Pistols for the first time that night—and recognised punk rock as the future. A return gig at the Nashville on 23 April demonstrated the band's growing musical competence, but by all accounts lacked a spark. Westwood provided that by instigating a fight with another audience member; McLaren and Rotten were soon involved in the melee. Cook later said, "That fight at the Nashville: that's when all the publicity got hold of it and the violence started creeping in.... I think everybody was ready to go and we were the catalyst." The Pistols were soon banned from both the Nashville and the Marquee.

On 23 April, as well, the debut album by the leading punk rock band in the New York scene, the Ramones, was released. Though it is regarded as seminal to the growth of punk rock in England and elsewhere, Lydon has repeatedly rejected any suggestion that it influenced the Sex Pistols: "[The Ramones] were all long-haired and of no interest to me. I didn't like their image, what they stood for, or anything about them"; "They were hilarious but you can only go so far with 'duh-dur-dur-duh'. I've heard it. Next. Move on." On 11 May, the Pistols began a four-week-long Tuesday night residency at the 100 Club. They devoted the rest of the month to touring small cities and towns in the north of England and recording demos in London with producer and recording artist Chris Spedding. The following month they played their first gig in Manchester, arranged by Devoto and Shelley. The Sex Pistols' 4 June performance at the Lesser Free Trade Hall set off a punk rock boom in the city.

On 4 and 6 July, respectively, two newly formed London punk rock acts, the Clash—with Strummer as lead vocalist—and the Damned, made their live debuts opening for the Sex Pistols. On their off-night on the 5th, the Pistols attended a Ramones gig at Dingwalls, like virtually everyone else at the center of the early London punk scene. During a return Manchester gig on the 20 July, the Pistols premiered a new song, "Anarchy in the U.K.", reflecting elements of the radical ideologies to which Rotten was being exposed. According to Jon Savage, "there seems little doubt that Lydon was fed material by Vivienne Westwood and Jamie Reid, which he then converted into his own lyric." Steve Jones later wrote, “You couldn’t fault Rotten for some of the words he came up with - for a nineteen-year-old to write ‘Pretty Vacant’ and ‘Anarchy in the UK’ was pretty fucking impressive. I might not have been too bothered about lyrics before, but I knew a fucking classic when I heard one.”

"Anarchy in the U.K." was among the seven originals recorded in another demo session that month, this one overseen by the band's sound engineer, Dave Goodman. McLaren organised a major event for 29 August at the Screen on the Green in London's Islington district, with the Buzzcocks and The Clash opening for the Pistols. Three days later, the band were in Manchester to tape what was their first television appearance, for Tony Wilson's So It Goes. Scheduled to perform just one song, "Anarchy in the U.K.", the band ran straight through another two numbers as pandemonium broke out in the control room.

The Sex Pistols played their first gig outside Britain on 3 September, at the opening of the Chalet du Lac disco in Paris. The Bromley Contingent were in attendance and Siouxsie Sioux was harassed by locals due to her outfit with bare breasts. The following day, the So It Goes performance aired; the audience heard "Anarchy in the U.K." introduced with a shout of "Get off your arse!" On 13 September, the Pistols began a tour of Britain. A week later, back in London, they headlined the opening night of the 100 Club Punk Special. Organised by McLaren (for whom the word "festival" had too much of a hippie connotation), the event was "considered the moment that was the catalyst for the years to come."  Belying the common perception that punk bands couldn't play their instruments, contemporary music press reviews, later critical assessments of concert recordings, and testimonials by fellow musicians indicate that the Pistols had developed into a tight, ferocious live band. As Rotten tested out wild vocalisation styles, the instrumentalists experimented "with overload, feedback and distortion...pushing their equipment to the limit".

Mainstream fame 

On 8 October 1976, the major record label EMI signed the band on a two-year contract. In short order, the band was in the studio recording a full-dress session with Dave Goodman. As later described by Matlock, "The idea was to get the spirit of the live performance. We were pressurized to make it faster and faster." The results were rejected by the band. Chris Thomas, who had produced Roxy Music and mixed Pink Floyd's The Dark Side of the Moon, was brought in to produce. The band's first single, "Anarchy in the U.K.", was released on 26 November 1976. John Robb—soon to be a cofounder of The Membranes and later a music journalist—described the record's impact: "From Steve Jones' opening salvo of descending chords, to Johnny Rotten's fantastic sneering vocals, this song is the perfect statement...a stunningly powerful piece of punk politics...a lifestyle choice, a manifesto that heralds a new era". Colin Newman, who had just cofounded the band Wire, heard it as "the clarion call of a generation."

"Anarchy in the U.K." was not the first British punk single, pipped by The Damned's "New Rose". "We Vibrate" had also appeared from The Vibrators, a pub rock band formed early in 1976 that had become associated with punk—though, according to Jon Savage "with their long hair and mildly risqué name, the Vibrators were passers-by as far as punk taste-makers were concerned." Unlike those songs, whose lyrical content was comfortably within rock 'n' roll traditions, "Anarchy in the U.K." linked punk to a newly politicised attitude—the Pistols' stance was aggrieved, euphoric and nihilistic, all at the same time. Rotten's howls of "I am an anti-Christ" and "Destroy!" repurposed rock as an ideological weapon. The single's packaging and visual promotion also broke new ground. Reid and McLaren came up with the notion of selling the record in a completely wordless, featureless black sleeve. The primary image associated with the single was Reid's "anarchy flag" poster: A ripped up and partly safety-pinned back together Union Flag, with the song and band names clipped along the edges of a gaping hole in the middle. This and other images created by Reid for the Sex Pistols quickly became punk icons.

The Sex Pistols' behaviour, as much as their music, brought national attention. On 1 December 1976, the band and members of the Bromley Contingent swore during an early evening live broadcast of Thames Television's Today programme, hosted by Bill Grundy. Appearing as last-minute replacements for fellow EMI artists Queen, who had dropped out because of Freddie Mercury's dental appointment, the band and their entourage were offered drinks as they waited to go on air. During the interview, Jones said the band had "fucking spent" its label advance and Rotten used the word "shit", although both of these statements were apparently inaudible to Grundy, who had earlier claimed to be drunk. He then engaged in repartee with Siouxsie Sioux, who declared that she had "always wanted to meet" him. Grundy responded, "Did you really? We'll meet afterwards, shall we?" This prompted the following exchange between Jones and the host:
Jones: You dirty sod. You dirty old man.
Grundy: Well keep going, chief, keep going. Go on. You've got another five seconds. Say something outrageous!
Jones: You dirty bastard.
Grundy: Go on, again.
Jones: You dirty fucker.
Grundy: What a clever boy!
Jones: What a fucking rotter. Savage's transcription, unlike Strongman's, Southall's, and the one that appears on the cover of the Daily Mirror, incorrectly has Grundy saying "ten seconds" and Jones saying "You fucking rotter."

Although the programme was only broadcast in the London region, the ensuing media coverage occupied the tabloid newspapers for days. The Daily Mirror famously ran the headline "The Filth and the Fury!", and also asked "Who are these punks?"; other papers such as the Daily Express ("Fury at Filthy TV Chat") and the Daily Telegraph ("4-Letter Words Rock TV") followed suit. Thames Television suspended Grundy and, though he was later reinstated, the interview effectively ended his career. Steve Jones reflected;Grundy was the big dividing line in the Sex Pistols’ story. Before it, we were all about the music, but from then on it was all about the media. In some ways it was our finest moment, but in others it was the beginning of the end … In terms of the Sex Pistols having any kind of long-term future, this sudden acceleration was the worst thing that could possibly happened. I still think we’d have got really big in the end without it, but the whole process would have been much slower and maybe less traumatic. I guess it was never our destiny to be a normal band who make a few albums and then fade away. Grundy was definitely the point where everybody’s egos started to spin out - McLaren’s probably the most of all.The episode made the band a household name in Britain and brought punk into the mainstream. They launched the UK Anarchy Tour, supported by the Clash and Johnny Thunders' band the Heartbreakers, over from New York. The Damned were briefly part of the tour, before McLaren kicked them off. Media coverage was intense, and many of the concerts were cancelled by organisers or local authorities; of approximately twenty scheduled gigs, only about seven actually took place. Following a campaign waged in the south Wales press, a crowd including carol singers and a Pentecostal preacher protested against the group outside a show in Caerphilly. Packers at the EMI plant refused to handle the band's single. London Conservative councillor Bernard Brook Partridge declared, "Most of these groups would be vastly improved by sudden death. The worst of the punk rock groups I suppose currently are the Sex Pistols. They are unbelievably nauseating. They are the antithesis of humankind. I would like to see somebody dig a very, very large, exceedingly deep hole and drop the whole bloody lot down it."

The band played twice in December 1976 at the Electric Circus, Manchester. Following the end of the tour in late December, three concerts were arranged in the Netherlands for January 1977. The band, hungover, boarded a plane at London Heathrow Airport early on 4 January; a few hours later, the Evening News was reporting that the band had "vomited and spat their way" to the flight. Despite categorical denials by the EMI representative who accompanied the group, the label, which was under political pressure, released the band from their contract. In one journalist's later description, the Pistols had "stoked a moral panic...precipitating the cancellation of gigs, the band’s expulsion from their EMI record deal and lurid tabloid tales of punk’s 'shock cult'". As McLaren fielded offers from other labels, the band went into the studio for a round of recordings with Goodman, their last with either him or Matlock.

Sid Vicious replaces Matlock 

On 28 February 1977, McLaren announcing that Matlock was leaving the band. McLaren claimed that Matlock had been dismissed "because he went on too long about Paul McCartney....the Beatles was too much." In a contemporary interview, Jones echoed the charge that Matlock had been sacked because he "liked the Beatles", although Matlock says this is untrue and more recently Steve Huey of AllMusic has noted that Matlock "was even more enamored of The Faces and the mod groups prominently featured on London pirate radio in the late '60s, as were Steve Jones and Paul Cook". Years later, Jones expanded on the matter: "He was a good writer but he didn't look like a Sex Pistol and he was always washing his feet. His mum didn't like the songs." Matlock told the NME that he had voluntarily left the band by "mutual agreement". Later, in his autobiography, he described the primary impetus as his increasingly acrimonious relationship with Rotten, exacerbated—in Matlock's account—by the rampant inflation of Rotten's ego "once he'd had his name in the papers". Lydon later claimed that "God Save the Queen", the belligerently sardonic song planned as the band's second single, had been the final straw: "[Matlock] couldn't handle those kinds of lyrics. He said it declared us fascists." Though the singer could hardly see how anti-royalism equated with fascism, he claimed, "Just to get rid of him, I didn't deny it." Jon Savage suggests that Rotten pushed Matlock out in an effort to demonstrate his power and autonomy from McLaren. Jones remembers it differently: "Tension had been mounting between Glen and John for a while, and when they had a really big row right around the time Glen started asking Malcolm awkward questions about where all the money was going, Matlock's days were probably numbered. Julien Temple says that getting rid of Glen and replacing him with Sid was the last project he saw Rotten and Malcolm really work together on". Matlock almost immediately formed his own band, Rich Kids, with Midge Ure, Steve New, and Rusty Egan.

Matlock was replaced by Rotten's friend and self-appointed "ultimate Sex Pistols fan" Sid Vicious. Born John Simon Ritchie, and later known as John Beverley, Vicious was previously drummer of two inner circle punk bands, Siouxsie and the Banshees and the Flowers of Romance. He was also credited with introducing the pogo dance to the scene at the 100 Club. John Robb claims it was at the first Sex Pistols residency gig, 11 May 1976; Matlock is convinced it happened during the second night of the 100 Club Punk Special in September, when the Pistols were off playing in Wales. In Matlock's description, Rotten wanted Vicious in the band because "[i]nstead of him against Steve and Paul, it would become him and Sid against Steve and Paul. He always thought of it in terms of opposing camps".

According to Jones, "to Cookie and me, it just didn’t make any sense to have someone who couldn’t play a note trying to fill Glen’s shoes, but it was never about the music for McLaren ... From the minute Sid joined the band, nothing was ever normal again." "After I left, the band became just what Malcolm thought they should. They were the Sex Pistols as a cartoon strip.” (Glen Matlock) Years later, Jones expressed regret about pushing out Matlock: "Looking back, I think [it] was a mistake. 'Cause we were what we were. Who cares if he washed his feet? That was him. I'm sure I had things that bugged him [too]". He also said that the band could have probably recorded more albums had Matlock stayed in the band and they had not participated in the television interview with Bill Grundy.

Julien Temple, then a film student whom McLaren had put on the Sex Pistols payroll to create a comprehensive audiovisual record of the band, concurs: "Sid was John's protégé in the group, really. The other two just thought he was crazy." McLaren later stated that, much earlier in the band's career, Vivienne Westwood had told him he should "get the guy called John who came to the store a couple of times" to be the singer. When Johnny Rotten was recruited for the band, Westwood said McLaren had got it wrong: "he had got the wrong John." It was John Beverley, the future Vicious, she had been recommending. McLaren approved the belated inclusion of Vicious, who had virtually no experience on his new instrument, on account of his look and reputation in the punk scene.

Vicious had been involved in a notorious incident during that memorable second night of the 100 Club Punk Special. Arrested for hurling a glass at The Damned that shattered and blinded a girl in one eye, he had served time in a remand centre—and contributed to the 100 Club banning all punk bands. At a previous 100 Club gig, he had assaulted Nick Kent with a bicycle chain. Indeed, McLaren's NME telegram said that Vicious's "best credential was he gave Nick Kent what he deserved many months ago at the Hundred Club".{{sfn|Strongman|2008|p=116} According to a later description by McLaren, "When Sid joined he couldn't play guitar but his craziness fitted into the structure of the band. He was the knight in shining armour with a giant fist." "Everyone agreed he had the look," Lydon later recalled, but musical skill was another matter. "The first rehearsals...in March of 1977 with Sid were hellish.... Sid really tried hard and rehearsed a lot". For a view that Vicious was a more competent bass player than his reputation would have it. Marco Pirroni, who had performed with Vicious in Siouxsie and the Banshees, has said, "After that, it was nothing to do with music anymore. It would just be for the sensationalism and scandal of it all. Then it became the Malcolm McLaren story".

Membership in the Sex Pistols had a progressively destructive effect on Vicious. As Lydon later observed, "Up to that time, Sid was absolutely childlike. Everything was fun and giggly. Suddenly he was a big pop star. Pop star status meant press, a good chance to be spotted in all the right places, adoration. That's what it all meant to Sid." Westwood had already been feeding him material, like a tome on Charles Manson, likely to encourage his worst instincts. Early in 1977, he met Nancy Spungen, an emotionally disturbed drug addict and sometime prostitute from New York. Spungen is commonly thought to be responsible for introducing Vicious to heroin, and the emotional codependency between the couple alienated Vicious from the other members of the band. Lydon later wrote, "We did everything to get rid of Nancy.... She was killing him. I was absolutely convinced this girl was on a slow suicide mission.... Only she didn't want to go alone. She wanted to take Sid with her.... She was so utterly fucked up and evil."

God Save the Queen 
The Pistols signed to A&M Records at a March 1977 press ceremony held outside Buckingham Palace. Afterwards, intoxicated, they made their way to the A&M offices. Afterwards, at A&M offices, Vicious reportedly broke a toilet bowl and Rotten verbally abused members of the label's staff. A couple of days later, the Pistols got into a fight with another band at a club; one of Rotten's pals threatened the life of a friend of A&M's English director; A&M broke their contract with the Pistols on the 16 March. Although twenty-five thousand copies of the "God Save the Queen" single had already been pressed, virtually all were destroyed.

Vicious debuted with the band at London's Notre Dame Hall on 28 March. In May, the band signed with Virgin Records, their third new label in little more than half a year. This was around the time that Lydon personally enlisted Dennis Morris as the band's official photographer, with Morris being constantly by their side for around 7 months. Virgin was more than ready to release "God Save the Queen", but new obstacles arose. Workers at the pressing plant laid down their tools in protest at the song's content. Jamie Reid's now famous cover, showing Queen Elizabeth II with her features obscured by the song and band names in cutout letters, offended the sleeve's plate makers.{{ After much talk, production resumed and the record was finally released on 27 May.

The scabrous lyrics—"God save the queen/She ain't no human being/And there's no future/In England's dreaming"—prompted widespread outcry. Several major chains refused to stock the single. It was banned not only by the BBC but also by every independent radio station, making it the "most heavily censored record in British history". Rotten boasted, "We're the only honest band that's hit this planet in about two thousand million years." Jones shrugged off everything the song stated and implied—or took nihilism to a logical endpoint: "I don't see how anyone could describe us as a political band. I don't even know the name of the prime minister." The song, and its public impact, are now recognised as "punk's crowning glory".

The Virgin release had been timed to coincide with the height of Queen Elizabeth's Silver Jubilee celebrations. By Jubilee weekend, a week and a half after the record's release, it had sold more than 150,000 copies. On 7 June, McLaren and the record label arranged to charter a private boat and have the Sex Pistols perform while sailing down the River Thames, passing Westminster Pier and the Houses of Parliament. The event, a mockery of the Queen's river procession planned for two days later, ended in chaos. Police launches forced the boat to dock, and constabulary surrounded the gangplanks at the pier. While the band members and their equipment were hustled down a side stairwell, McLaren, Westwood, and many of the band's entourage were arrested. In critic Sean O'Hagan's description, the Pistols had set off the "last and greatest outbreak of pop-based moral pandemonium".

With the official UK record chart for Jubilee week about to be released, the Daily Mirror predicted that "God Save the Queen" would be number one. As it turned out, the record placed second, behind the Rod Stewart single "I Don't Want to Talk About It" in its fourth week at the top. Many believed that the record had actually qualified for the top spot, but that the chart had been rigged to prevent a spectacle. McLaren later claimed that CBS Records, which was distributing both singles, told him that the Sex Pistols were actually outselling Stewart two to one. There is evidence that an exceptional directive was issued by the British Phonographic Institute, which oversaw the chart-compiling bureau, to exclude sales from record-company operated shops such as Virgin's for that week only.

Attacks on punk fans rose and in mid-June Rotten was assaulted by a knife-wielding gang outside Islington's Pegasus pub, causing tendon damage to his left arm. Jamie Reid and Paul Cook were beaten up in other incidents; three days after the Pegasus assault, Rotten was attacked again. According to Cook, after the God Save The Queen single and the Bill Grundy incident, the Pistols were public enemy number one, and there was a rivalry between gangs of rockabillies or Teddie Boys and the punks which resulted in many fights. A tour of Scandinavia, planned to start at the end of the month, was delayed until mid-July. In Oslo, Lydon posed for photographs by making the Nazi salute while wearing a sweater with a Swastika. During the tour, a Swedish interviewer told Jones that "a lot of people" regarded the band as McLaren's "creation". Jones replied, "He's our manager, that's all. He's got nothing to do with the music or the image...he's just a good manager." In another interview, Rotten professed bafflement at the furore surrounding the group: "I don't understand it. All we're trying to do is destroy everything." At the end of August came SPOTS—Sex Pistols on Tour Secretly, a surreptitious UK tour with the band playing under pseudonyms to avoid cancellation.

McLaren had wanted for some time to make a movie featuring the Sex Pistols. Julien Temple's first major task had been to assemble Sex Pistols Number 1, a 25-minute mosaic of footage from various sources, much of it refilmed by Temple from television screens. Number 1 was often screened at concert venues before the band took the stage. Using media footage from the Thames incident, Temple created another propaganda-like short, Jubilee Riverboat (aka Sex Pistols Number 2).

Album 

Since the spring of 1977, the three senior Sex Pistols had been returning to the studio periodically with Chris Thomas to lay down the tracks for the band's debut album. Initially to be called God Save Sex Pistols, it became known during the summer as Never Mind the Bollocks. According to Jones, "Sid wanted to come down and play on the album, and we tried as hard as possible not to let him anywhere near the studio. Luckily he had hepatitis at the time." Cook later described how many of the instrumental tracks were built up from drum and guitar parts, rather than the usual drum and bass.

Given Vicious's incompetence, Matlock had been invited to record as a session musician. In his autobiography, Matlock says he agreed to "help out", but then suggests that he cut all ties after McLaren issued the 28 February NME telegram announcing Matlock had been fired for liking the Beatles. According to Jon Savage, Matlock did play as a hired hand on 3 March, for what Savage describes as an "audition session". In his autobiography, Lydon claims that Matlock's work-for-hire for his ex-band was extensive—much more so than any other source reports—seemingly to amplify a putdown: "I think I'd rather die than do something like that." Music historian David Howard states unambiguously that Matlock did not perform on any of the Never Mind the Bollocks recording sessions.

It was Jones who ultimately played most of the bass parts on Bollocks; Howard calls his rudimentary, rumbling approach the "explosive missing ingredient" of the Sex Pistols' sound. Vicious's bass is reportedly present on one track that appeared on the original album release, "Bodies". Jones recalls, "He played his farty old bass part and we just let him do it. When he left I dubbed another part on, leaving Sid's down low. I think it might be barely audible on the track." Following "God Save the Queen", two more singles were released from these sessions, "Pretty Vacant" (largely written by Matlock) on 1 July and "Holidays in the Sun" on 14 October. Each was a Top Ten hit.

Never Mind the Bollocks, Here's the Sex Pistols was released on 28 October 1977. Rolling Stone praised the album as "just about the most exciting rock & roll record of the Seventies", applauding the band for playing "with an energy and conviction that is positively transcendent in its madness and fever". Some critics, disappointed that the album contained all four previously released singles, dismissed it as little more than a "greatest hits" record.

Containing both "Bodies"—in which Rotten utters "fuck" six times—and the previously censored "God Save the Queen" and featuring the word bollocks (popular slang for testicles) in its title, the album was banned by Boots, W. H. Smith and Woolworth's. The Conservative shadow minister for education condemned it as "a symptom of the way society is declining" and both the Independent Television Companies' Association and the Association of Independent Radio Contractors banned its advertisements. Nonetheless, advance sales were sufficient to make it an undeniable number one on the album chart.

The album title led to a legal case that attracted considerable attention: a Virgin Records store in Nottingham that put the album in its window was threatened with prosecution for displaying "indecent printed matter". The case was thrown out when defending QC John Mortimer produced an expert witness who established that bollocks was an Old English term for a small ball, that it appeared in place names without causing local communities erotic disturbance, and that in the nineteenth century it had been used as a nickname for clergymen: "Clergymen are known to talk a good deal of rubbish and so the word later developed the meaning of nonsense." In the context of the Pistols' album title, the term does in fact primarily signify "nonsense". Steve Jones off-handedly came up with the title as the band debated what to call the album. An exasperated Jones said, "Oh, fuck it, never mind the bollocks of it all."

After playing a few dates in the Netherlands—the beginning of a planned multinational tour—the band set out on a Never Mind the Bans tour of Britain in December 1977. Of eight scheduled dates, four were cancelled due to illness or political pressure. On Christmas Day, the Sex Pistols played two shows at Ivanhoe's in Huddersfield. Before a regular evening concert, the band performed a benefit matinee for the children of "striking firemen, laid-off workers and one-parent families." These were the band's final UK performances for more than eighteen years.

Break-up 
In January 1978, the Sex Pistols began a US tour, eventually consisting of dates mainly  in America's Deep South. It was delayed due to American authorities' reluctance to issue visas to Jones' criminal record, resulting in the cancellation of several dates in the north-east. Though highly anticipated by fans and media, the tour was plagued by in-fighting, poor planning and belligerent and violent audiences. McLaren later admitted that he purposely booked redneck bars to provoke hostile situations. Over the course of the two weeks, Vicious, heavily addicted to heroin, attempted to live up to his stage name. According to Lydon "he finally had an audience of people who would behave with shock and horror...Sid was easily led by the nose."

Early in the tour, Vicious left his Holiday Inn in Memphis, looking to buy drugs. When eventually found, he received a beating from the security team hired by Warner Bros., the band's American label. He subsequently appeared with the words "Gimme a fix" on his chest—accounts vary as to whether the words were written or carved there. During a concert in San Antonio, Vicious called the crowd "a bunch of faggots", before striking an audience member across the head with his bass guitar. In Baton Rouge, he received simulated oral sex on stage, later declaring "that's the kind of girl I like". Suffering from heroin withdrawal during a show in Dallas, he spat blood at a woman who had climbed onstage and punched him in the face. He was admitted to hospital later that night to treat various injuries. Offstage he is said to have kicked a photographer, attacked a security guard, and eventually challenged one of his own bodyguards to a fight—beaten up, he is reported to have exclaimed, "I like you. Now we can be friends."

Rotten was suffering flu and coughing up blood, and felt increasingly isolated from Cook and Jones, and disgusted by Vicious. Jones later said that he and Cook "couldn’t stand being around Johnny and Sid anymore. You couldn’t turn round for a minute without Sid starting a fight...Then on top of that you had Rotten, who was on his own trip and basically thought he was God by that stage."

On 14 January 1978, during the tour's final date at the Winterland Ballroom in San Francisco, a disillusioned Rotten introduced the band's encore saying, "You'll get one number and one number only 'cause I'm a lazy bastard." That one number was a Stooges cover, "No Fun". At the end of the song, Rotten, kneeling on the stage, chanted an unambiguous declaration, "This is no fun. No fun. This is no fun—at all. No fun." As the final cymbal crash died away, Rotten addressed the audience directly—"Ah-ha-ha. Ever get the feeling you've been cheated? Good night"—before throwing down his microphone and walking offstage. He later observed, "I felt cheated, and I wasn't going on with it any longer; it was a ridiculous farce. Sid was completely out of his brains—just a waste of space. The whole thing was a joke at that point.... [Malcolm] wouldn't speak to me.... He would not discuss anything with me. But then he would turn around and tell Paul and Steve that the tension was all my fault because I wouldn't agree to anything."

On 17 January, the band made their way separately to Los Angeles. McLaren, Cook and Jones prepared to fly to Rio de Janeiro for a working vacation. Vicious, in increasingly bad shape, was taken to Los Angeles by a friend, who then brought him to New York, where he was immediately hospitalised. Rotten flew to New York, where he announced the band's break-up in a newspaper interview on 18 January. Virtually broke, he telephoned the head of Virgin Records, Richard Branson, who agreed to pay for his flight back to London, via Jamaica. In Jamaica, Branson met with members of the band Devo, and tried to install Rotten as their lead singer. Devo declined the offer, which Rotten also found unappealing.

Cook, Jones and Vicious never performed together again live after Rotten's departure. Over the next several months, McLaren arranged for recordings in Brazil (with Jones and Cook), Paris (with Vicious) and London; each of the three and others stepped in as lead vocalists on tracks that in some cases were far from what punk was expected to sound like. These recordings were to make up the musical soundtrack for the reconceived Pistols feature film project, directed by Julien Temple, to which McLaren was now devoting himself. On 30 June, a single credited to the Sex Pistols was released: on one side, notorious criminal Ronnie Biggs sang "No One Is Innocent" accompanied by Jones and Cook; on the other, Vicious sang the classic "My Way", over both a Jones–Cook backing track and a string orchestra. The single reached number seven on the charts, eventually outselling all the singles with which Rotten was involved. Savage describes the single as being a double A-side; other sources indicate that the Biggs vocal was the A-side and the Vicious vocal the B-side (e.g., Gimarc, George, Punk Diary, p. 145). There is no disagreement that the Vicious side was the more popular. McLaren was seeking to reconstitute the band with a permanent new frontman, but Vicious—McLaren's first choice—had sickened of him. In return for agreeing to record "My Way", Vicious had demanded that McLaren sign a sheet of paper declaring that he was no longer Vicious's manager. In August, Vicious, back in London, delivered his final performances as a nominal Sex Pistol: recording and filming cover versions of two Eddie Cochran songs. The bassist's return to New York in September put an end to McLaren's dreaming.

Aftermath 
After leaving the Pistols, Johnny Rotten reverted to his birth name of Lydon, and formed Public Image Ltd. (PiL) with the former Clash member Keith Levene and school friend Jah Wobble. The band went on to score a UK top-ten hit with their debut single, 1978's "Public Image". Lydon initiated legal proceedings against McLaren and the Sex Pistols' management company, Glitterbest, which McLaren controlled. Among the claims were non-payment of royalties, improper usage of the title "Johnny Rotten", unfair contractual obligations, and damages for "all the criminal activities that took place".

Vicious relocated to New York and attempted a career a solo artist with Nancy Spungen acting as his manager. He recorded the live album Sid Sings, backed by the Idols, featuring Arthur Kane and Jerry Nolan of the New York Dolls; it was released in 1979. On 12 October 1978, Spungen was found dead in the Hotel Chelsea room she was sharing with Vicious, with a stab wound to her stomach and dressed only in her underwear. Police recovered drug paraphernalia from the scene and Vicious was arrested and charged with her murder. In an interview at the time, McLaren said, "I can't believe he was involved in such a thing. Sid was set to marry Nancy in New York. He was very close to her and had quite a passionate affair with her." The actor Rockets Redglare, who delivered pills to the apartment, has been mentioned as a possible alternative to Vicious as Spungen's killer.

While free on bail, Vicious smashed a beer mug in the face of Patti Smith's brother Todd Smith, and was arrested again on an assault charge. On 9 December 1978 he was sent to Rikers Island jail, where he spent 55 days and underwent enforced cold-turkey detox. He was released on 1 February 1979; some time after midnight, following a small party to celebrate his release, Vicious died of a heroin overdose. He was twenty-one years old. Reflecting on the event, Lydon said, "Poor Sid. The only way he could live up to what he wanted everyone to believe about him was to die. That was tragic, but more for Sid than anyone else. He really bought his public image."

Hearings for Lydon's lawsuit began in February 1979, five days after Vicious's death. Cook and Jones were allied with McLaren, but as evidence mounted that their manager had poured virtually all of the band's revenue into his film project, they switched sides. On 14 February, the court put the film and its soundtrack into receivership—no longer under McLaren's control, they were now to be administered as exploitable assets for addressing the band members' financial claims. McLaren, with substantial personal debts and legal fees, took off for Paris to sign a record deal for an LP of standards, including "Non, je ne regrette rien". A month later, back in London, he disassociated himself from the film to which he had devoted so much time and money. McLaren went on to carry out a one-month consultancy for Adam and the Ants and manage their offshoot Bow Wow Wow. In the mid-1980s he released a number of successful and influential records as a solo artist.

Post Lydon releases 
The Great Rock 'n' Roll Swindle, a soundtrack album for the still-uncompleted film, was released by Virgin Records in February 1979. It consists mostly of tracks covers and new tracks sung by Jones, Vicious, Cook, Ronnie Biggs, McLaren and Edward Tudor-Pole. Several tracks feature Rotten's vocals from early unissued sessions, in some cases with re-recorded music by Jones and Cook. There is one live cut, from the band's final concert in San Francisco. The album is completed by a couple of tracks in which other artists cover Sex Pistols classics.

Four Top Ten singles were culled from the Swindle recordings, one more than had appeared on Never Mind the Bollocks. The 1978 "No One Is Innocent"/"My Way" was followed in 1979 by Vicious's cover of "Something Else" (number three, and the biggest-selling single ever under the Sex Pistols name); Jones singing an original, "Silly Thing" (number six); and Vicious's second Cochran cover, "C'mon Everybody" (number three). Two more singles from the soundtrack were put out under the Pistols brand—Tudor-Pole, among others, singing "The Great Rock 'n' Roll Swindle" and a Rotten vocal from 1976, "(I'm Not Your) Steppin' Stone"; both fell just shy of the Top Twenty. On 21 November 1980, the final "new" studio recordings attributed to the Sex Pistols were released by Virgin: "Black Leather" and "Here We Go Again", recorded by Jones and Cook during the mid-1978 Swindle sessions, were paired as one of a half-dozen 7-inch records (the other five reconfiguring previously released material) sold together as Sex Pack.

The Sex Pistols film was completed by Temple, who received sole credit for the script after McLaren had his name taken off the production. Released in 1980, The Great Rock 'n' Roll Swindle heavilly reflects McLaren's vision. It is a fictionalised and partially animated retelling of the band's history and aftermath with McLaren in the lead role, Jones as second lead, and contributions from Vicious (including his memorable performance of "My Way") and Cook. It incorporates promotional videos shot for "God Save the Queen" and "Pretty Vacant" and extensive documentary footage as well, much of it focusing on Rotten. In Temple's description, he and McLaren conceived it as a "very stylized...polemic". They were reacting to the fact that the Pistols had become the "poster on the bedroom wall of the day where you kneel down last thing at night and pray to your rock god. And that was never the point.... The myth had to be dynamited in some way. We had to make this film in a way to enrage the fans". In the film, McLaren claims to have created the band from scratch and engineered its notorious reputation; much of what structure the loose narrative has is based on McLaren's teaching a series of "lessons" to be learned from "an invention of mine they called the punk rock".

Cook and Jones continued to work through guest appearances and as session musicians. In 1980, they formed the Professionals, which lasted for two years. Jones went on to play with the bands Chequered Past and Neurotic Outsiders. He also recorded two solo albums, Mercy and Fire and Gasoline. Now a resident of Los Angeles, he hosts a daily radio program, Jonesy's Jukebox. Having played with the band Chiefs of Relief in the late 1980s and with Edwyn Collins in the 1990s, Cook is now a member of Man Raze. Following the Rich Kids' break-up in 1979, Matlock played with various bands, toured with Iggy Pop, and recorded several solo albums. He is currently a member of Slinky Vagabond.

The 1979 court ruling left many issues between Lydon and McLaren unresolved. Five years later, Lydon filed another action. Finally, on 16 January 1986, Lydon, Jones, Cook and the estate of Sid Vicious were awarded control of the band's heritage, including the rights to The Great Rock 'n' Roll Swindle and all the footage shot for it—more than 250 hours., That same year, a fictionalised film account of Vicious's relationship with Spungen was released: Sid and Nancy, directed by Alex Cox. In his autobiography, Lydon lambastes the film, saying that it "celebrates heroin addiction", goes out of its way to "humiliate [Vicious's] life", and completely misrepresents the Sex Pistols' part in the London punk scene.

Reunions 

The original four Sex Pistols reunited in 1996 for the six-month Filthy Lucre Tour, which included dates in Europe, North and South America, Australia and Japan. The band members' access to the archives associated with The Great Rock 'n' Roll Swindle facilitated the production of the 2000 documentary The Filth and the Fury. This film—directed, like its predecessor, by Temple—was formulated as an attempt to tell the story from the band's point of view, in contrast to Swindles focus on McLaren and the media. In 2002—the year of the Queen's Golden Jubilee—the Sex Pistols reunited again to play the Crystal Palace National Sports Centre in London. In 2003, their Piss Off Tour took them around North America for three weeks.

On 9 March 2006, the band sold the rights to their back catalogue to Universal Music Group. An anonymous commentator for Australian newspaper The Age called this a "sell out". In November 2006, the Sex Pistols were inducted to the Rock and Roll Hall of Fame. The band rejected the honour in coarse language on their website. In a television interview, Lydon said the Hall of Fame could "Kiss this!" and made a rude gesture. According to Jones, "Once you want to be put into a museum, Rock & Roll's over; it's not voted by fans, it's voted by people who induct you, or others; people who are already in it."

The Sex Pistols reunited for five performances in the UK in November 2007. In 2008, they undertook a series of European festival appearances, titled the Combine Harvester Tour. In August, after performing at the Dutch festival A Campingflight to Lowlands Paradise, Lowlands director Eric van Eerdenburg declared the Pistols' performance "saddening": "They left their swimming pools at home only to scoop up some money here. Really, they're nothing more than that." That same year, they released the DVD There'll Always Be An England, recorded at their Brixton Academy appearance on 10 November 2007. In 2010, Fragrance and Beauty Limited announced the release of an authorised Sex Pistols scent. According to a statement from the cosmetics firm, "the fragrance exudes pure energy, pared down and pumped up by leather, shot through with heliotrope and brought back down to earth by a raunchy patchouli." The band signed with Universal Music Group in 2012 to re-release Never Mind the Bollocks, Here's the Sex Pistols.

On 30 October 2018, former Sex Pistols members Steve Jones and Paul Cook joined up with Billy Idol and Tony James, both formerly of another first wave English punk rock band Generation X, to perform a free entry gig at The Roxy in Hollywood, Los Angeles under the name Generation Sex, playing a combined set of the two former bands' material.

Legacy

Influence 

The Sex Pistols are regarded as one of the most groundbreaking acts in the history of popular music.  The Trouser Press Record Guide entry on the Sex Pistols remarks that "their importance—both to the direction of contemporary music and more generally to pop culture—can hardly be overstated". Rolling Stone has argued that the band, "in direct opposition to the star trappings and complacency" of mid-1970s rock, came to spark and personify one of the few truly critical moments in pop culture—the rise of punk." In 2004, the magazine ranked the Sex Pistols No. 58 on its list of the "100 Greatest Artists of All Time". Leading music critic Dave Marsh called them "unquestionably the most radical new rock band of the Seventies."

Although the Sex Pistols were not the first punk band, the few recordings that were released during the band's brief initial existence were singularly catalytic expressions of the punk movement. The releases of "Anarchy in the U.K.", "God Save the Queen" and Never Mind the Bollocks are counted among the most important events in the history of popular music. Never Mind the Bollocks is regularly cited in accountings of all-time great albums: in 2006, it was voted No. 28 in Q magazine's "100 Greatest Albums Ever", while Rolling Stone listed it at No. 2 in its 1987 "Top 100 Albums of the Last 20 Years". It has come to be recognised as among the most influential records in rock history. An AllMusic critic calls it "one of the greatest, most inspiring rock records of all time".

The Sex Pistols directly inspired the style, and often the formation itself, of many punk and post-punk bands during their first two-and-a-half-year run. The Clash, Siouxsie and the Banshees, the Adverts, Vic Godard of Subway Sect, and Ari Up of the Slits are among those in London's "inner circle" of early punk bands that credit the Pistols.

The Sex Pistols' 4 June 1976 concert at Manchester's Lesser Free Trade Hall was to become one of the most significant and mythologised events in rock history. Among the audience of merely forty people or so were many who became leading figures in the punk and post-punk movements: Pete Shelley and Howard Devoto, who organised the gig, as well as Bernard Sumner, Ian Curtis and Peter Hook, Mark E. Smith, John Cooper Clarke, Morrissey and Anthony H. Wilson saw the band at their second Manchester band on 20 July.

Among the many musicians of a later time who have acknowledged their debt to the Pistols are members of the Jesus and Mary Chain, NOFX, The Stone Roses, Guns N' Roses, Nirvana, Green Day, and Oasis. Tim Mohr links Western radio airplay of the Sex Pistols as helping create the whole East German punk movement. Calling the band "immensely influential", a London College of Music study guide notes that "many styles of popular music, such as grunge, indie, thrash metal and even rap owe their foundations to the legacy of ground breaking punk bands—of which the Sex Pistols was the most prominent."

According to Ira Robbins of the Trouser Press Record Guide, "the Pistols and manager/provocateur Malcolm McLaren challenged every aspect and precept of modern music-making, thereby inspiring countless groups to follow their cue onto stages around the world. A confrontational, nihilistic public image and rabidly nihilistic socio-political lyrics set the tone that continues to guide punk bands." Critic Toby Creswell locates the primary source of inspiration somewhat differently. Noting that "[i]mage to the contrary, the Pistols were very serious about music", he argues, "the real rebel yell came from Jones' guitars: a mass wall of sound based on the most simple, retro guitar riffs. Essentially, the Sex Pistols reinforced what the garage bands of the '60s had demonstrated—you don't need technique to make rock & roll. In a time when music had been increasingly complicated and defanged, the Sex Pistols' generational shift caused a real revolution."

Although much of the Sex Pistols' energy was directed against the establishment, not all of rock's elder statesmen dismissed them. Pete Townshend of the Who said:
When you listen to the Sex Pistols, to "Anarchy in the U.K." and "Bodies" and tracks like that, what immediately strikes you is that this is actually happening. This is a bloke, with a brain on his shoulders, who is actually saying something he sincerely believes is happening in the world, saying it with real venom, and real passion. It touches you and it scares you—it makes you feel uncomfortable. It's like somebody saying, "The Germans are coming!  And there's no way we're gonna stop 'em!"

Along with their abundant musical influence, the Sex Pistols' cultural reverberations are evident elsewhere. Jamie Reid's work for the band is regarded as among the most important graphic design of the 1970s and still influences the field in the 21st century. By the age of twenty-one, Sid Vicious was already a "t-shirt-selling icon". While the manner of his death signified for many the inevitable failure of punk's social ambitions, it cemented his image as an archetype of doomed youth. British punk fashion, still widely influential, is now customarily credited to Westwood and McLaren; as Johnny Rotten, Lydon had a lasting effect as well, especially through his bricolage approach to personal style: he "would wear a velvet collared drape jacket (ted) festooned with safety pins (Jackie Curtis through the New York punk scene), massive pin-stripe pegs (modernist), a pin-collar Wemblex (mod) customised into an Anarchy shirt (punk) and brothel creepers (ted)." Christopher Nolan, director of the Batman movie The Dark Knight, has said that Rotten inspired the characterisation of The Joker, played by Heath Ledger. According to Nolan, "We very much took the view in looking at the character of the Joker that what's strong about him is this idea of anarchy. This commitment to anarchy, this commitment to chaos."

Conceptual basis 
The Sex Pistols were defined by ambitions that went well beyond the musical—indeed, McLaren was at times openly contemptuous of the band's music and punk rock generally. "Christ, if people bought the records for the music, this thing would have died a death long ago," he said in 1977.

He claimed that the Sex Pistols were his personal, Situationist-style art project: "I decided to use people, just the way a sculptor uses clay." "Punk became the most important cultural phenomenon of the late 20th century", McLaren later asserted. "Its authenticity stands out against the karaoke ersatz culture of today, where everything and everyone is for sale.... [P]unk is not, and never was, for sale." They were something with which "to sell trousers", as McLaren said in 1989; a "carefully planned exercise to embezzle as much money as possible out of the music industry", as Jon Savage characterises McLaren's core theme in The Great Rock 'n' Roll Swindle "cash from chaos" as the movie repeatedly puts it.

Lydon, in turn, dismissed McLaren's influence: "We made our own scandal just by being ourselves. Maybe it was that he knew he was redundant, so he overcompensated. All the talk about the French Situationists being associated with punk is bollocks. It's nonsense!" Cook agreed and said that "Situationism had nothing to do with us. The Jamie Reids and Malcolms were excited because we were the real thing. I suppose we were what they were dreaming of." According to Lydon, "If we had an aim, it was to force our own, working-class opinions into the mainstream, which was unheard of in pop music at the time."

Toby Creswell argues that the "Sex Pistols' agenda was inchoate, to say the least. It was a general call to rebellion that falls apart at the slightest scrutiny." Critic Ian Birch, writing in 1981, called "stupid" the claim that the Sex Pistols "had any political significance.... If they did anything, they made a lot of people content with being nothing. They certainly didn't inspire the working classes." While the Conservative triumph in 1979 may be taken as evidence for that position, Julien Temple has noted that the scene inspired by the Sex Pistols "wasn't your kind of two-up, two-down working class normal families, most of it. It was over the edge of the precipice in social terms. They were actually giving a voice to an area of the working class that was almost beyond the pale." Within a year of "Anarchy in the U.K." that voice was being echoed widely: scores if not hundreds of punk bands had formed across the country—groups composed largely of working-class members or middle-class members who rejected their own class values and pursued solidarity with the working class.

In 1980, critic Greil Marcus reflected on McLaren's contradictory posture:
It may be that in the mind of their self-celebrated Svengali...the Sex Pistols were never meant to be more than a nine-month wonder, a cheap vehicle for some fast money, a few laughs, a touch of the old épater la bourgeoisie. It may also be that in the mind of their chief terrorist and propagandist, anarchist veteran...and Situational artist McLaren, the Sex Pistols were meant to be a force that would set the world on its ear...and finally unite music and politics. The Sex Pistols were all of these things.
A couple of years before, Marcus had identified different roots underlying the band's merger of music and politics, arguing that they "have absorbed from reggae and the Rastas the idea of a culture that will make demands on those in power which no government could ever satisfy; a culture that will be exclusive, almost separatist, yet also messianic, apocalyptic and stoic, and that will ignore or smash any contradiction inherent in such a complexity of stances." Critic Sean Campbell has discussed how Lydon's Irish Catholic heritage both facilitated his entrée into London's reggae scene and complicated his position for the ethnically English working class—the background his bandmates had in common.

Critic Bill Wyman acknowledges that Lydon's "fierce intelligence and astonishing onstage charisma" were important catalysts, but ultimately finds the band's real meaning lies in McLaren's provocative media manipulations. While some of the Sex Pistols' public affronts were plotted by McLaren, Westwood, and company, others were evidently not—including what McLaren himself cites as the "pivotal moment that changed everything", the clash on the Bill Grundy Today show.. Concerning the time the band spent waiting to go on air, Siouxsie Sioux later said, "I've got a feeling that Malcolm was geeing them up, stirring it a bit". Her view is belied by the version of the incident in Phil Strongman's Pretty Vacant, which appears to rely on McLaren himself. According to Strongman, McLaren "was inconsolable" "Malcolm milked situations", says Cook, "he didn't instigate them; that was always our own doing." Matlock later wrote that at the point when he left the band, it was beginning to occur to him that McLaren "was in fact quite deliberately perpetrating that idea of us as his puppets.... However, on the other hand, I've since found out that even Malcolm wasn't as aware of what he was up to as he has since made out." By his absence, Matlock demonstrated how crucial he was to the band's creativity: in the eleven months between his departure and the Pistols' demise, they composed only two songs.

Music historian Simon Reynolds argues that McLaren came into his own as an auteur only after the group's break-up, with The Great Rock 'n' Roll Swindle and the recruitment of Ronnie Biggs as a vocalist. Much subsequent commentary on the Sex Pistols has relied on taking seriously McLaren's onscreen proclamations in the film, whether lending them credence or not. As music journalist Dave Thompson noted in 2000, "[T]oday, Swindle is viewed by many as the truth" (despite the fact that the movie purveys, among other things, a completely illiterate Steve Jones, a talking dog, and Sid Vicious shooting audience members, including his mother, at the conclusion of "My Way"). Temple points out that McLaren's characterisation was intended as "a big fucking joke—that he was the puppetmeister who created these pieces of clay from plasticine boxes that he modeled away and made Johnny Rotten, made Sid Vicious. It was a joke that they were completely manufactured." (In his final onscreen scene in the film, McLaren declares that he was planning the Sex Pistols affair, "Ever since I was ten years old! Ever since Elvis Presley joined the army!" [1956 and 1958, respectively].) Temple acknowledges that McLaren ultimately "perhaps took this too much to heart."

According to Pistols tour manager Noel Monk and journalist Jimmy Guterman, Lydon was more than "the band's mouthpiece. He's its raging brain. McLaren or his friend Jamie Reid might drop a word like 'anarchy' or 'vacant' that Rotten seizes upon and turns into a manifesto, but McLaren is not the Svengali to Rotten he'd like to be perceived as. McLaren thought he was working with a tabula rasa, but he soon found out that Rotten has ideas of his own". On the other hand, there is little disagreement about McLaren's marketing talent and his crucial role in making the band a subcultural phenomenon soon after its debut. According to Temple, Lydon "catalyzed so many people's heads. He had so many just extraordinary ideas". Savage emphasises that "it was Steve Jones who first had the idea of putting the group, or any group, together with McLaren. He chose McLaren, not vice versa."

Band members 
Official members
 Johnny Rotten – lead vocals 
 Steve Jones – guitar, bass 
 Paul Cook – drums
 Glen Matlock – bass 
 Sid Vicious – bass 

Early members
 Wally Nightingale – guitar (1975)
 Nick Kent – lead guitar (1975)
 Steve New – lead guitar (1975)

Guest musicians
Musicians other than the band members who recorded songs with Steve Jones and Paul Cook on The Great Rock 'n' Roll Swindle:
 Ronnie Biggs – lead vocals on "No One Is Innocent", "Belsen Was a Gas"
 Edward Tudor-Pole – lead vocals on "The Great Rock 'n' Roll Swindle", "Who Killed Bambi?", "Rock Around the Clock"
 Malcolm McLaren – lead vocals on "God Save The Queen (Symphony)", "You Need Hands"
 Dave Goodman – bass on "The Great Rock 'n' Roll Swindle"
 Andy Allan – bass on "Silly Thing" (single version)

Discography

Studio albums

Other albums

Singles

Notes

References

Bibliography

External links 

 
 

 
1975 establishments in England
A&M Records artists
EMI Records artists
English punk rock groups
Musical groups disestablished in 1978
Musical groups established in 1975
Musical groups from London
Musical groups reestablished in 1996
Musical quartets
Obscenity controversies in music
Universal Music Group artists
Virgin Records artists
Warner Records artists
Controversies in the United Kingdom